Charles Gilchrist Adams (born December 13, 1936 in Detroit, Michigan) served as the first Nickerson Professor of the Practice of Ethics and Ministry at Harvard Divinity School from 2007 to 2012.

Biography

Adams served as the senior pastor at Hartford Memorial Baptist Church in Detroit, Michigan, United States, since 1969.

Adams earned a bachelor's degree from the University of Michigan and a Master of Divinity from Harvard Divinity School. He obtained a Rockefeller Fellowship of Harvard University, a Doctoral Fellowship of Union Theological Seminary and the Merrill Theological Fellowship of Harvard University.

In 1991 and 1992, Ebony selected Adams as one of the 100 "Most Influential Black Americans".

In 1993, Ebony magazine listed Adams in their list of "The 15 Greatest Black Preachers".

Notes

External links
 
 

Living people
Clergy from Detroit
Cass Technical High School alumni
University of Michigan alumni
Harvard Divinity School alumni
African-American Baptist ministers
Baptist ministers from the United States
Harvard Divinity School faculty
1936 births
Baptists from Michigan
21st-century African-American people
20th-century African-American people